Pet Engine was an alternative/power-pop band that formed in Milwaukee, Wisconsin, in the early 1990s under the name "Blackfish" until a Florida-based "Blackfish" achieved success and forced a name change.  Although they never achieved widespread commercial success, Pet Engine did release three albums and one EP on its label, Don't Records.  The singles "Place to Breathe", "Reinventing the Wheel" and "Popular Teenage Disease" achieved a moderate amount of radio play in several American radio markets. The band was included on the Aware Records compilation volume 8 which also featured up-and-coming artists John Mayer and Howie Day.  During their career, P.E. served as support for Oasis, Lemonheads, Goo Goo Dolls, Violent Femmes, Blind Melon, Verve Pipe and Mason Jennings among others. Their last official performance before a series of reunions came at Summerfest playing with Fountains of Wayne and Wilco. The band achieved a cult following in the Milwaukee music scene, often playing with popular Milwaukee bands like Citizen King and The Gufs, and were a regular act at Milwaukee's Summerfest for several years.  Although Pet Engine broke up in early 2003, they were briefly reunited when they played at Summerfest 2006.

Discography
Hearts And Bones And Voices (1994)
Musicalbum EP (1995)
Feeling Like a Hundred Bucks (Don't Records, 1997)
Megahurtz (Don't Records, 2000)

Compilations
Uncharted - 1991 (as "Blackfish")
Son of Uncharted - 1993 (as "Blackfish")
Made In Wisconsin - 1997
Gag Me With A Spoon - 1994
 Aware Records The Compilation Vol. 8- 2000

Members
Steve Ziel - Vocals/Guitar
Clem Blanding - Bass
Al Hildebrand - Guitar
Micah Havertape - Drums

Past members
Dan Andera - Drums (1993-1996)
Matt Schroeder - Guitar (1990-1994)
Dan Schroeder - Drums (1990 - 1992)

References

Alternative rock groups from Wisconsin
Musical groups from Wisconsin